Volcán Tupungatito is the northernmost historically active stratovolcano of the southern Andes. Part of the Chilean Andes' volcanic segment, it is the northernmost member of the Southern Volcanic Zone (SVZ), which is one of several distinct volcanic belts in the Andes. Over 70 Pleistocene or Holocene age volcanoes make up this volcanic belt, which on average has one eruption per year.

Tupungatito lies in proximity to the border between Argentina and Chile, 50 miles east of the Chilean capital Santiago. The caldera is filled with ice, and glaciers on the volcano are important sources of water for the Rio Maipo river and Santiago.

Volcanism is caused by the subduction of the Nazca Plate underneath the South America Plate. Tupungatito formed less than 100,000 years ago and has had a number of historical eruptions, the latest in 1987, which were mostly small explosive eruptions. Presently, the volcano features an acidic crater lake and numerous fumaroles. Renewed eruptions could induce volcanic ash falls in Argentina and dangerous mudflows in Chile.

Name and history 

It refers to the neighbouring Tupungato volcano; Luis Risopatrón also reported that Tupungatito was an active volcano. The volcano is also known as Volcan Bravard, a name proposed by Argentina but which fell into disuse; it references the French paleontologist Auguste Bravard.

There was speculation about the existence of a volcano in the Andes near Santiago already during the Colonial Era, but only by 1890 was there a clear identification and even then it was frequently assumed that Tupungato instead was the only active edifice. The first ascent of the volcano probably took place in 1907, by K. Griebel, H. Gwinner, L. Hanisch, K. Heitmann and J. Philippi.

Geography and geomorphology 

Tourism, mountaineering and hiking are the principal economic activities in the area; in addition, there are mines and hydropower plants in the valleys.

Three crater lakes are hosted within these craters; one has a turquoise colour and highly acidic water. The total volume of the volcano is estimated to be , and its flows are fresh and uneroded.
 The caldera may either be of volcanic origin or the product of a giant landslide. In the past, lava flows have exited the caldera through the northwestern opening.

Glaciers and hydrology 

Above  elevation, the volcano is covered with ice. The caldera contains the Tupungatito glacier, with a volume of about  it is the most important glacier of the Metropolitana Region. Outlet glaciers of glaciers in the region are typically covered with debris. In 2012, an ice core was drawn from the Tupungatito glacier.

The ice and snow cover on Tupungatito is an important source of water for the rivers in the region and Santiago. Meltwater is discharged westwards into the Colorado-Maipo river system that eventually flows through Santiago; the Quebrada Seca, Estero de Tupungatito and Estero de Tupungato originate close to the volcano and are tributaries to the Colorado. Some glaciers drain instead eastward into the Rio Tupungato river, which as a tributary of the Rio Mendoza is an important water source for the inhabitants of Mendoza in Argentina and the surrounding agricultural areas. Arsenic pollution in the Maipo river system may originate from springs associated the volcanoes Tupungatito and San Jose.

Geology

Regional 

Volcanism in the Andes occurs in four separate volcanic belts, the Northern Volcanic Zone, the Central Volcanic Zone, the Southern Volcanic Zone (SVZ) and the Austral Volcanic Zone.

It features over 70 Pleistocene or Holocene stratovolcanoes, as well as calderas, maars and scoria cones. About 30-40 were active postglacially and 18-20 in historical times; the SVZ is the most active volcanic zone in Chile with about one eruption per year. Tupungatito is part of the northernmost SVZ, a narrow and short chain which includes Diamante caldera/ Volcan Maipo and San Jose volcano, and is the northernmost active volcano of the SVZ. Tupungato-Tupungatito, San Jose-Marmolejo and Maipo are the highest volcanoes of the SVZ.

Local 

The basement underneath Tupungatito consists of evaporites and marine limestones of Cretaceous age. Cretaceous conglomerates, sandstones and volcaniclastic rocks, as well as Miocene sediments. The Mesozoic rocks have been deformed during regional tectonic activity and there are numerous reverse faults in the area. Southwest-northeast and north-south trending faults and fractures influence volcanic activity at Tupungatito; the SW-NE trending lineament also includes Tupungato.

Tupungato and Nevado Sin Nombre formed during the late and early Pleistocene, respectively, and are presently inactive. The caldera is to a large degree formed by rocks from Nevado Sin Nombre.  high Nevado de los Piuquenes is a fourth volcano in this group and overlaps with Nevado Sin Nombre. Below  elevation, Tupungatito is underlaid by an eroded volcano whose rocks resemble Tupungato.

Composition 

Tupungatito has erupted rocks ranging from basaltic andesite to dacite, which define a potassium-rich calc-alkaline suite. There has been little compositional variation during its history. Phenocrysts include clinopyroxene and plagioclase and less commonly olivine and orthopyroxene. Amphibole and biotite occur as xenocrysts. Magma genesis at Tupungatito and other volcanoes in the region appears to involve a small amount of fluids but large amounts of sediments carried down by the slab, with a moderate interaction with the crust. Processes involved are fractional crystallization, low degrees of partial melting and short periods of storage in magma chambers.

Climate 

Most precipitation occurs between May and September, when the north-south movement of the South Pacific High and the Westerlies lets frontal systems reach the area.

Glaciers have alternatively advanced and retreated during the 20th century. Volcanic eruptions have not significantly altered the ice extent.

Eruption history 

Tupungatito is about 55,000 or less than 80,000 years old. They have been dated to 52,000±23,000 and 31,000±10,000 years ago, respectively. About 30,000 years ago, a change to a more effusive style of volcanic activity took place with shorter lava flows, although with shorter lava flows. Numerous debris avalanches took place on Tupungatito and left deposits in the western valleys. Tupungatito may be the source of late Pleistocene rhyolite deposits around the city of Mendoza and Pleistocene tephra overlying glacial deposits in the Rio Mendoza valley.

Holocene activity added an explosive component with Vulcanian and phreatomagmatic eruptions, which deposited pyroclastic materials around the volcano. Short lava flows with lengths of on average  were also produced and display flow structures such as levees and lobes. Some of the flows are covered with sediments. The decline of the ice cover during the Holocene and an increased distance between glaciers and volcanic vents may have been responsible for this change in eruption style.

Historical activity 

Records of activity at Tupungatito go back to 1646 but its eruption record is poorly known, owing to its inaccessible location. Sometimes, eruptions at Tupungatito were incorrectly attributed to Tupungato. With over 19 eruptions between 1829 and 1987, Tupungatito is one of the SVZ's most active volcanoes. The historical eruptions took place in the craters north of the caldera, and involved in total eight craters. The intensity of the eruptions did not exceed a Volcanic Explosivity Index of 2. Many eruptions appear to be linked to tectonic events in Central Chile.

In 1835, Charles Darwin in his diary mentioned a muleteer telling him that he had seen smoke coming from close to Tupungato  although he crossed the Andes close to Portillo de los Piuquenes rather than the Alto Colorado; this is almost certainly a reference to Tupungatito. In 1962 the volcano was reportedly smoking.

Eruptions at Tupungatito frequently deposited volcanic ash in Mendoza. There is also evidence of ionospheric impacts from this eruption. The 1961 and 1964 eruptions formed one crater each, with the 1964 crater located directly south of the 1961 one. A third crater was the site of the three last eruptions in 1980, 1986 and 1987. The 1986 eruption deposited a thin ash layer over glaciers in the area. The last activity took place in 1987.

Present-day status and threats 

Gas bubbling has been observed in the crater lakes. The crater lakes and/or fumaroles are visible in satellite images, where they appear as temperature anomalies. The gases come from the magma, ultimately from the downgoing slab, and as they ascend they interact and mix with an overlying aquifer and a hydrothermal system. There is also shallow seismicity around the volcano.

Since 2012, the volcano is monitored by the Southern Volcanological Observatory of the Andes. Intense eruptions could melt the ice on the volcano through the emission of incandescent rocks and pyroclastic flows, producing medium-sized or long lahars in the Quebrada de Tupungatito and Estero del Azufre valleys. Pyroclastic fallout from high eruption columns would most likely occur in Argentina. Future eruptions will most likely be small or medium-sized Strombolian eruptions. The nearest towns in Chile are El Alfalfal, El Manzano and Los Maitenes and in Argentina La Consulta, San Carlos, Tunuyan and Tupungato. For Argentina, it is the 4th most dangerous volcano, and for Chile, the 22nd most dangerous volcano. Due to a combination between its relative proximity to population centres, high volume of ice and frequency of eruptions, a 2020 study ranked it the 4th most dangerous volcano on Earth in terms of lava-ice interactions. Eruptions may also endanger tourists.

See also
 List of volcanoes in Argentina
 List of volcanoes in Chile

Notes

References

Sources

Bibliography

External links 
 

Active volcanoes
Mountains of Chile
Mountains of Argentina
South Volcanic Zone
Polygenetic volcanoes
Volcanoes of Santiago Metropolitan Region
Stratovolcanoes of Argentina
Volcanoes of Mendoza Province
Stratovolcanoes of Chile
Five-thousanders of the Andes
Principal Cordillera
Pleistocene stratovolcanoes
Holocene stratovolcanoes